Casasia calophylla, is a species of plant belonging to the family Rubiaceae, it is native to Cuba.

References

calophylla